Elle Jade Mulvaney (born 1 October 2002) is an English actress who has played the role of Amy Barlow in ITV soap opera Coronation Street.

Career
Mulvaney started her acting through the Carol Godby Theatre Workshop, which she has attended since the age of four. Mulvaney's casting as Amy Barlow was announced in March 2010, taking over from Amber Chadwick. A spokeswoman said "Amy has some big storylines coming up so we decided to recast an older child who could play younger. This is common practice."

Awards and nominations

References

External links

Living people
2002 births
People from Bury, Greater Manchester
English child actresses
English soap opera actresses
Actresses from Greater Manchester
21st-century English actresses